Mahesh Bhupathi and Max Mirnyi were the defending champions, but did not play together this year.  Bhupathi partnered Jonas Björkman, losing in the final.  Mirnyi partnered Marat Safin, withdrawing from the quarterfinals.

Igor Andreev and Nikolay Davydenko won the title, defeating Bhupathi and Björkman 3–6, 6–3, 6–4 in the final.

Seeds

Draw

External links
 2004 Kremlin Cup Men's Doubles Draw

Kremlin Cup
Kremlin Cup